Districts were the secondary territorial subdivisions of the Independent State of Croatia. There were 139 of them originally, with that number changing after the capitulation of Italy and the discontinuation of the Rome Agreement. The districts were each a part of a county, and were themselves further divided into municipalities.

Districts in 1941

Districts in 1943

References 
 Croatia OR 5360 (1:1 000 000) London : War Office, 1941
 Kraljevina Jugoslavija MDR Misc 7596 (1:2 800 000), Great Britain. Army. Royal Engineers. Map Reproduction Section, 1944
 Volkstumskarte von Jugoslawien (1:200 000) Wilfried Krallert, Wien, (1941)
 Encyclopædia Britannica 17th Edition, Austria-Hungary (1:3 800 000), 1905
 Crna Legija website

Independent State of Croatia